ATLS may refer to:

 Advanced trauma life support
 Automated truck loading systems